Antoine Vermorel-Marques (born 17 February 1993) is a French politician who has represented the 5th constituency of the Loire department in the National Assembly since 2022. A member of The Republicans (LR), he has also held a seat in the Departmental Council of Loire for the canton of Renaison since 2021.

Vermorel-Marques was a municipal councillor in Renaison from 2020 to 2022.

References 

Living people
1993 births
Deputies of the 16th National Assembly of the French Fifth Republic
Members of Parliament for Loire
Departmental councillors (France)
21st-century French politicians
The Republicans (France) politicians
People from Roanne
Sciences Po alumni